Frederick Dyer may refer to:
 Frederick Dyer (cricketer), English cricketer and medical doctor
 Frederick H. Dyer, drummer boy in the Union Army during the American Civil War

See also
 Fred Dyer, Welsh boxer, boxing manager and baritone singer